See Canyon is a valley in San Luis Obispo County, California.

History
See Canyon originally San Miguelito Canyon, the old Spanish name, from which the name of the Rancho San Miguelito grant to Don Miguel Avila was derived. It was renamed for the pioneer family of Joseph See, who was:
"... a native of Kentucky, who moved to Indiana and from there to Texas, and thence to California, coming with ox teams over the southern route settling first in San Bernardino County. In 1860, he came with his family to San Luis Obispo County and bought land, which was named See Canyon after him. He [Joseph] farmed here for many years. He lived to be eighty eight years of age, and was a very influential and public-spirited man"

The 1860 Census of San Luis Obispo, lists Joseph See as a teamster worth $600.00 in personal property and landless.  "Early grant records for the region show that See Canyon is one of the few areas not covered by an old Spanish grant and may have been public property. As a newcomer to the area, Joseph [See] may have homesteaded/squatted on that area, since no other land was available. Joseph's daughter Rachel and her husband William Calloway are known to have been long time residents of the Canyon and owned 160 acres of the Canyon."

References

Valleys of San Luis Obispo County, California